Matayen is a village in Drass tehsil in Kargil district of the Indian union territory of Ladakh. The village is located around 21 kilometer's from drass and around 81 kilometres from the district headquarters Kargil.Its only village in ladakh where Kashmiri is spoken and Kashmiri peoples are being lived.

Demographics
According to the 2011 census of India, Matayen had 239 households. The literacy rate of Matayen village is 62.86%. In Matayen, Male literacy stands at 62.86% while the female literacy rate was 49.36%.

Transport

Road
Matayen is connected by road to other places in Ladakh and India by the NH1.

Rail
The nearest major railway stations to Matayen is Jammu Tawi railway station located at a distance of 386 kilometres.

Air
The nearest airport is located in Kargil at a distance of 89 kilometres but it is currently non-operational. The next nearest major airport is Srinagar International Airport located at a distance of 133 kilometres.

See also
Ladakh
Kargil
Drass

References

Villages in Drass tehsil